In algebra, Hall's universal group is
a  countable locally finite group, say U, which is uniquely 
characterized by the following properties.

 Every finite group G admits a monomorphism to U.
 All such monomorphisms are conjugate by inner automorphisms of U.

It was defined by Philip Hall in 1959, and has the universal property that all countable locally finite groups embed into it.

Construction 

Take any group  of order . 
Denote by  the group  
 the group

and so on. Since a group acts faithfully on itself by permutations

according to Cayley's theorem, this gives a chain of monomorphisms

A direct limit (that is, a union) of all 
is Hall's universal group U.

Indeed, U then contains a symmetric group of arbitrarily large order, and any
group admits a monomorphism to a group of permutations, as explained above.
Let G be a finite group admitting two embeddings to U.
Since U is a direct limit and G is finite, the 
images of these two embeddings belong to 
. The group 
 acts on 
by permutations, and conjugates all possible embeddings
.

References

Infinite group theory
Permutation groups